is a retired Japanese freestyle wrestler. In 1962, he debuted internationally and retired shortly after the 1964 Olympics. During his brief career Watanabe won all his few hundred bouts. He is considered one of the best wrestlers in Olympic history.

In the early 2000s Watanabe resumed competing internationally in the masters category.

References

Japanese male sport wrestlers
1940 births
Living people
Olympic gold medalists for Japan
Olympic wrestlers of Japan
Sportspeople from Hokkaido
Olympic medalists in wrestling
Asian Games medalists in wrestling
Wrestlers at the 1962 Asian Games
Wrestlers at the 1964 Summer Olympics
World Wrestling Champions
Medalists at the 1964 Summer Olympics
Asian Games gold medalists for Japan
Medalists at the 1962 Asian Games
20th-century Japanese people
21st-century Japanese people